Yu Yiting (born 5 September 2005) is a Chinese swimmer. She competed in the women's 200 metre individual medley at the 2019 World Aquatics Championships. Yu competed in the 200 meter individual medley and 400 meter individual medley at the 2020 Olympic Games.

References

External links
 

2005 births
Living people
Chinese female butterfly swimmers
Place of birth missing (living people)
Chinese female medley swimmers
Swimmers at the 2020 Summer Olympics
Olympic swimmers of China
Medalists at the FINA World Swimming Championships (25 m)
21st-century Chinese women